The qualifying rounds for the 2006–07 UEFA Champions League began on 11 July 2006. In total, there were three qualifying rounds which provided 16 clubs to join the group stage.

Teams

First qualifying round
The draw for this round was performed on 23 June 2008 in Nyon, Switzerland.

Seeding

Summary
The first legs were played on 11 and 12 July 2006, with the second legs on 18 and 19 July.

|}

Matches

Ekranas won 3–1 on aggregate.

FH Hafnarfjörður won 4–3 on aggregate.

Liepājas Metalurgs won 2–1 on aggregate.

MyPa won 2–0 on aggregate.

Cork City won 2–1 on aggregate.

Sioni Bolnisi won 2–1 on aggregate.

Rabotnički won 1–0 on aggregate.

Široki Brijeg won 2–0 on aggregate.

B36 Tórshavn won 5–2 on aggregate.

Gorica won 5–3 on aggregate.

Sheriff Tiraspol won 2–0 on aggregate.

Second qualifying round
The draw for this round was performed on 23 June 2008 in Nyon, Switzerland.

Seeding

Notes

Summary
The first legs were played on 25 and 26 July 2006, with the second legs on 1 and 2 August.

|}

Matches

Steaua București won 5–0 on aggregate.

Levski Sofia won 4–0 on aggregate.

Red Bull Salzburg won 3–2 on aggregate.

Ružomberok won 3–2 on aggregate.

Rabotnički won 5–2 on aggregate.

Red Star Belgrade won 4–0 on aggregate.

Fenerbahçe won 9–0 on aggregate.

Mladá Boleslav won 5–3 on aggregate.

1–1 on aggregate. Spartak Moscow won on the away goals rule.

Dynamo Kyiv won 8–1 on aggregate.

Legia Warsaw won 3–0 on aggregate.

Copenhagen won 4–2 on aggregate.

Dinamo Zagreb won 9–3 on aggregate.

Hearts won 3–0 on aggregate.

Third qualifying round
The draw for this round was performed on 28 July 2006 in Nyon, Switzerland.

Seeding

Notes

Summary
The first legs were played on 8 and 9 August 2006, with the second legs on 22 and 23 August.

|}

The teams eliminated in this round qualified for the first round of the UEFA Cup.

Matches

Spartak Moscow won 2–1 on aggregate.

Shakhtar Donetsk won 4–2 on aggregate.

Valencia won 3–1 on aggregate.

Levski Sofia won 4–2 on aggregate.

AEK Athens won 5–1 on aggregate.

CSKA Moscow won 5–0 on aggregate.

Milan won 3–1 on aggregate.

Galatasaray won 6–3 on aggregate.

Steaua București won 4–3 on aggregate.

Benfica won 4–1 on aggregate.

Arsenal won 5–1 on aggregate.

Copenhagen won 3–2 on aggregate.

1–1 on aggregate. Hamburg won on the away goals rule.

Dynamo Kyiv won 5–3 on aggregate.

Liverpool won 3–2 on aggregate.

Lille won 4–0 on aggregate.

Notes

References

External links
2006–07 UEFA Champions League Statistics Handbook

Qualifying
2006-07